Näcip Ğayaz ulı Cihanov — Tatar Cyrillic: Нәҗип Гаяз улы Җиһанов, pronounced ; ; anglicised as Najip Jihanov or, more usually, Nazib Gayazovich Zhiganov — was a Soviet and Tatar composer, pedagogue and statesman.

Cihanov wrote eight operas (notably Altınçäç and Cälil), three ballets, 15 symphonies, other symphonic works (Qırlay, Suite on Tatar Themes, Näfisä, Symphonic novellas, and Symphonic Songs among them), the cantata Republic of Mine (1960), camera-instrumental compositions, and romances and songs.

Granted the titles of People's Artist of the USSR (1957) and Hero of Socialist Labour (1981), Cihanov served as artistic leader of the Tatar Opera and Ballet from 1941 to 1943, chairman of Tatarstan's Composers Union from 1939 to 1977, and rector of Kazan Conservatory from 1945 to 1988. He was made professor in 1953; Kazan Conservatory was renamed in his honor in 2000. Importantly, Cihanov was one of the founders of the State Symphony Orchestra of Tatarstan. In his capacity as statesman, he served as a deputy in the Supreme Soviet of RSFSR (1951–1959), the Tatar ASSR (1963–1967, 1977–1988), and indeed the Soviet Union (1966–1970).

Operas
Qaçqın (1939)
İrek (1940) "Freedom"
Altınçäç (1941) "The golden-haired girl"
İldar (1942)
Tüläk (1945)
Namus (1950) "Honour"
Cälil (1957) based on the life of poet Musa Cälil.

References and notes

1911 births
1988 deaths
20th-century classical composers
People from Oral, Kazakhstan
Academic staff of Kazan Conservatory
Moscow Conservatory alumni
Seventh convocation members of the Supreme Soviet of the Soviet Union
Heroes of Socialist Labour
People's Artists of the USSR
Stalin Prize winners
Recipients of the Order of Lenin
Recipients of the Order of the Red Banner of Labour
Recipients of the USSR State Prize
Ballet composers
Male opera composers
Tatar culture
Tatar people of the Soviet Union
Tatar composers
Tatar music
Tatar musicians
Soviet classical musicians
Soviet male composers
Soviet music educators
Soviet opera composers
Burials at Arskoe Cemetery